North East India Christian Council (NEICC) is a Protestant ecumenical council of North East India, affiliated to the National Council of Churches in India as one of the regional councils in the year 1939.

History
The North East India Christian Council (NEICC) was established on 23 November 1937 by the American Baptist Mission; the Santal Mission of the Northern Churches; the Gossner Evangelical Lutheran Mission; the Co-operative Baptist Mission of North America- "the Mid Mission", the English Baptist Mission South Lushai Hills; the Church of God; the Welsh Presbyterian Mission; and the Church of India.

Organization

Office Bearers 

The Office Bearers are for a term of two years, except the General Secretary whose term is four years. The present Office Bearers for the term 2022-2024 are:

 President:         Rev. R. Lalnunzira, Baptist Church of Mizoram
 Vice President:    Rev. S.R. Dkhar, Khasi Jaintia Presbyterian Church Synod Mihngi
 Vice President:    Bishop Ichahak Muchahary, Bodo Evangelical Lutheran Church                    
 General Secretary: Rev. Dr. Ramengliana, Manipur Presbyterian Church Synod
 Treasurer:         Rev. S.T. Shangdiar, Khasi Jaintia Presbyterian Church Synod Sepngi

Committees 

The Council has the following Committees:
 Executive Committee
 Working Committee

Six Standing Committees as the following:
 Christian Home and Stewardship Committee
 Church Union Committee
 Mission & Evangelism Committee
 Peace and Justice Committee
 Theological Education Committee
 Trust Management Committee.

Youth and Women Assembly

The Council has Women and Youth Assembly called NEICCWA and NEICCYA having separate functions and administration under the guidance of the NEICC. Each of them meets every two years in Biennial Assembly. Women Assembly has full-time Secretary and run a hostel for women. Both the assemblies often organize various programs for its members.

Annual Session/Biennial Session

The Council meets once every two years in a Biennial Assembly in the third week of May in which each member Church and associate members send their representatives according to the basis of representation made by the Council.

Union Christian College (UCC)
The NEICC runs a College called, ‘the Union Christian College’ at Umiam Khwan (Barapani), Ri Bhoi district, Meghalaya, 27 km away from Shillong. It is fully residential and co-educational. It offers courses in Arts and Science and Commerce streams. It has been placed under the Deficit System of the Government of Meghalaya. A Chaplain and a Doctor is also posted to care for spiritual and physical life of the community. The College is affiliated to North Eastern Hill University (NEHU).

UCC Higher Secondary School
Along side the Union Christian College, NEICC also runs UCC Higher Secondary School offering Arts and Science streams.

NEICC Day of Prayer
All affiliated bodies  observe the NEICC Day of Prayer, that falls annually on the third Sunday of October. Prayers are offered for the life and ministry of NEICC, sermons are preached on a selected theme for that day and special offerings are collected for NEICC funds. In some cities, Pulpit Exchange programs are practiced where preachers of NEICC units would go and preach in the pulpits of other denominations. This practice is highly beneficial for the promotion of unity and mutual understanding among the units.

Membership 
Membership is open to any Protestant church in North East India with a membership of 5000 and above, that is recommended by a unit which is nearest to the applying body. At present, there are 55 units, 37 churches and 18 para-church organizations. The following is the list of NEICC as it stands in 2022:

Member Churches 
   Assam Baptist Convention (ABC), Assam
 	Baptist Church of Mizoram (BCM), Mizoram
 	Biateram Presbyterian Church Synod (BPCS),  Assam
 	Bodo Evangelical Lutheran Church (BELC), Assam 
 	Cachar Hill Tribes Synod (CHT), Assam
 	Church of God (Meghalaya & Assam) (COGMA), Meghalaya
 	Church of God (Ecclesia)(COGE), Meghalaya
 	Church of North India, North East India (CNI-NEI), Meghalaya
 	Council of Baptist Churches in NEI (CBCNEI), Assam
 	Christ National Church (CNC), Meghalaya
 	Evangelical Assembly Church (EAC), Manipur
 	Evangelical Church of Maraland (ECM), Mizoram
 	Evangelical Free Church of India (EFCI), Manipur
 	Evangelical Churches Association (ECA), Manipur
 	Garo Baptist Convention (GBC), Meghalaya
 	Gossner Evangelical Lutheran Church (GELC), Assam
 	Lairam Jesus Christ Baptist Church (LIKBK), Mizoram
 	Independent Church of India (ICI), Manipur
 	Isua Krista Kohhran (IKK), Mizoram
 	Karbi Anglong Baptist Convention (KABC), Assam
 	Karbi Anglong Presbyterian Church Synod(KAPC), Assam
 	Khasi Jaintia Presbyterian Synod Sepngi(KJPSS), Meghalaya
 	Khasi Jaintia Presbyterian Synod Mihngi(KJPSM), Meghalaya
 	Lower Assam Baptist Union (LABU), Assam
 	Manipur Baptist Convention (MBC), Manipur
 	Manipur Presbyterian Church Synod(MPS), Manipur
 	Mizoram Presbyterian Church Synod(MPCS), Mizoram
 	Nagaland Baptist Church Council (NBCC), Nagaland
 	North Bank Baptist Christian Association (NBBCA), Assam
 	Northern Evangelical Lutheran Church (NELC), Assam
 	Presbyterian Independent Church of NEI(PICNEI), Assam
 	Reformed Presbyterian Church, North Eastern India(RPCNEI), Manipur
 	Ri-Bhoi Presbyterian Church Synod(RBPS), Meghalaya
 	The Salvation Army, India Eastern Territory(SAIET), Mizoram
 	Tripura Baptist Christian Union (TBCU), Tripura
 	Tripura Presbyterian Church Synod (TPCS), Tripura
 	Zou Presbyterian Church Synod (ZPCS), Manipur

Associate Members 
 	Association of Theologically Trained Women in India (ATTWI), Mizoram Branch
 	Church’s  Auxiliary for Social Action, North East India (CASA), Guwahati
 	Friends Missionary Prayer Band (FMPB), Shillong
 	India Campus Crusade for Christ (CCC), Bairasal
 	India Every Home Crusade North East India (IEHC-NEI), Shillong
 	Mizo Theological Association (MTA), Aizawl
 	North East Centre for Training and Research (NECTAR), Shillong
 	NEI Christian Endeavour (NEICE), Shillong
 	NEI Committee on Relief and Development (NEICORD), Shillong
 	North East India Harvest Network(NEIHN), Shillong
 	Serving in Missions North East India (SIMNEI), Shillong
 	Shillong Christian Youth Organisation & Conference (SCYO &C), Shillong
 	Students Christian Movement of NEI (SCM-NEI) Zone I 
 	The Leprosy Mission, Mizoram (TLM), Aizawl
 	Thlarau Bo Zawngtute (TBZ), Aizawl.
 	World Vision of India, NEI, (WVI) Guwahati 
 	Young Men Christian Association (YMCA NEI ), Guwahati
 	Zoram Evangelical Fellowship (ZEF), Aizawl

See also
 Council of Baptist Churches in North-East India
 National Council of Churches in India
 List of Christian denominations in North East India

External links
nccindia.in Website of National Council of Churches in India
www.neiccshillong.in Website of North East India Christian Council

References

Churches in India
Northeast India
Christian organisations based in India